Laua, also known as Labu, is a language of Papua New Guinea.  It is (or was) spoken in the Central Province, north and west of Laua according to Ethnologue.  Laua had only one remaining speaker in 1987, and is now extinct.

References 

Languages of Central Province (Papua New Guinea)
Critically endangered languages
Extinct languages of Oceania
Mailuan languages